Jennifer Brigid O'Malley Dillon (born September 28, 1976) is an American political strategist and campaign manager serving as the White House deputy chief of staff under President Joe Biden. She was the manager of Biden's 2020 presidential campaign, having served as manager of Beto O'Rourke's presidential campaign of the same year. She is the first female presidential campaign manager for a winning Democratic ticket.

Early life and education
O'Malley Dillon's great-grandparents were Irish Catholic immigrants from Gorumna Island, County Galway. Born in the Jamaica Plain neighborhood of Boston, she has three siblings. Her parents are Kevin O'Malley, a school administrator, and Kathleen O'Malley. When O'Malley Dillon was a child the family relocated from Jamaica Plain to Franklin, Massachusetts, to be closer to her father's job.

O'Malley Dillon attended Tufts University, where she majored in political science and was captain of the university's softball team. In 1998, she earned her bachelor's degree. O'Malley Dillon decided she wanted to work in politics while on a family vacation to Washington, D.C.

Career
O'Malley Dillon's first role in politics was answering phones for Massachusetts attorney general Scott Harshbarger. She joined Al Gore's 2000 presidential campaign as a field organizer in 1999 and rose to become a regional field director by the end of the campaign. She worked as a field director for the U.S. Senate campaigns of Tim Johnson and Mary Landrieu. In 2003, she worked as Iowa field director for John Edwards's 2004 presidential campaign, and, after Edwards left the race, became deputy campaign manager for Senator Tom Daschle's reelection campaign.

In 2007, O'Malley Dillon again went to work for John Edwards on his 2008 presidential campaign as his Iowa state director and later deputy campaign manager. After Edwards was again eliminated, she joined Barack Obama's presidential campaign for the general election as battleground states director. After Obama's election, she worked on the presidential transition as associate director of personnel, and then was hired as the executive director of the Democratic National Committee under Tim Kaine.

In 2011, O'Malley Dillon joined Obama's 2012 reelection campaign as deputy campaign manager, contributing to Project Narwhal. After Obama's reelection, she co-founded the political consulting firm Precision Strategies with fellow Obama campaign alumni Stephanie Cutter and Teddy Goff. She led Precision's consulting effort for the Liberal Party of Canada in the 2015 Canadian federal election.

After the 2016 United States presidential election, O'Malley Dillon chaired the Democratic National Committee's Unity Reform Commission. In 2019, she was involved in an effort by Democratic Party data and political personnel to create a data exchange to allow for greater information sharing between Democratic campaigns and allies, a project that party leaders see as crucial for catching up with the Republican data program. Later in 2019, she was hired as manager of Beto O'Rourke's 2020 presidential campaign.

Through Precision, O'Malley Dillon also advised Gates Ventures, a venture capital firm founded by Bill Gates; the Chan Zuckerberg Initiative, founded by Mark Zuckerberg and his wife, Priscilla Chan; General Electric; and Lyft; her deferred compensation and severance from Precision was at least $420,000.

In April 2020, O'Malley Dillon was announced as the new manager for Biden's 2020 presidential campaign. She succeeded Greg Schultz and Anita Dunn, who had shared campaign management duties for the previous month and remained with the campaign as senior advisors. O'Malley Dillon was the first person to serve as Biden's campaign manager who was not related to him. Biden's sister, Valerie Biden Owens, had served as Biden's campaign manager for all his previous campaigns, but only served in a senior advisory role in his 2020 presidential campaign. On November 16, 2020, it was announced that O'Malley Dillon would assume the role of White House deputy chief of staff in the administration.

Personal life

O'Malley Dillon is married to Patrick Dillon. They have three children. Her second cousin is Matt O'Malley, acting president of the Boston City Council in 2021.

References

External links

Jen O’Malley Dillon profile from the Biden-Harris Administration website

1976 births
American campaign managers
American people of Irish descent
American Roman Catholics
Biden administration personnel
Joe Biden 2020 presidential campaign
Living people
People from Franklin, Massachusetts
Tufts University School of Arts and Sciences alumni
Washington, D.C., Democrats